The Urrao Cochran frog ("Cochranella" megistra) is a species of frog in the family Centrolenidae.
It is endemic to Colombia.
Its natural habitats are subtropical or tropical moist montane forests and rivers.

References

Cochranella
Amphibians of Colombia
Taxa named by Juan A. Rivero
Amphibians described in 1985
Taxonomy articles created by Polbot